Kuben (English: The Cube) may refer to:

Kuben Vocational Arena, a centre for Vocational Education and Training in Oslo, Norway
Kuben Upper Secondary School, at Økern in Oslo, Norway
Arena Polarica, an indoor ice hockey arena in Haparanda, Sweden, is also called Kuben

See also 
Qube (disambiguation)